Leudelange railway station is a railway station serving Leudelange, in south-western Luxembourg.  It is operated by Chemins de Fer Luxembourgeois, the state-owned railway company.

The station is situated on Line 70, which connects the south-west of the country to Luxembourg City.

External links
 Official CFL page on Leudelange station
 Rail.lu page on Leudelange station

Railway station
Railway stations in Luxembourg
Railway stations on CFL Line 70